The 2017–18 season is the 73rd Crvena zvezda season in the existence of the club. The team has been playing in the Basketball League of Serbia, in the Adriatic League and in the Euroleague.

Overview 
During the summer of 2017, the head coach Dejan Radonjić didn't sign new contract, and the club parted ways with no less than eleven players, including key figures in the last couple of years such as Marko Simonović, captain Luka Mitrović, Charles Jenkins, Stefan Jović, Ognjen Kuzmić and Marko Gudurić. Young prospect Dušan Alimpijević was named as the head coach. Depleted roster was reinforced by James Feldeine and Taylor Rochestie, veterans Pero Antić and Marko Kešelj and a quartet of young players: Mathias Lessort, Nikola Radičević, Stefan Janković and Nikola Jovanović. Zvezda also brought in Dragan Apić, Dejan Davidovac and Stefan Lazarević from its development team FMP. Half of rebuilt team hasn't previously played a single game in EuroLeague.

During October 2017, the Zvezda won six out of ten played games. The Adriatic League season opening started with three wins in a row. In the EuroLeague they won on two home games over FC Barcelona and Maccabi.

Breaking with defense oriented philosophy of Radonjić era, the staple of Zvezda's game became 3 point shot. In December 2017. roster was further strengthened with combo guard Dylan Ennis, while Apić and Lazarević got loaned back to FMP. Last player to arrive was Slovenian national team center Alen Omić, while underperforming Radičević parted ways with the club. Zvezda finished first in the regular part of ABA league, having 19 wins and 3 losses, and reached finals by defeating Mornar 2–1 in series, but lost 3–1 in final series to Budućnost. Defeat meant that club will not participate in Euroleague next year, which triggered downsizing. Management terminated contract with Dylan Ennis and Milko Bjelica, and reinforced squad with Filip Čović and young prospect Aleksa Radanov from FMP. Poor start in domestic KLS forced coach Alimpijević to resign, and his assistant Milenko Topić took over as interim head coach. Modified team managed to win the Superleague title, beating FMP in the finals, but the season was generally deemed to be unsuccessful due to failure to secure a spot in Euroleague.

Players

Squad information

Depth chart

Players with multiple nationalities
    Pero Antić
   James Feldeine
   Stefan Janković
   Alen Omić
   Taylor Rochestie

On loan

Youth players 
Under a contract
  Ranko Simović
  Arijan Lakić

Registered for the Adriatic League
  Zoran Paunović
  Nemanja Popović
  Lazar Vasić

Players In

Source: ABA League, Euroleague

Players Out

Notes:
 1 Sign and trade. Didn't play a single regular season game.
 2 Missed entire 2016–17 season due to injury.
 3 Played for the U18 team.
 4 On loan during entire 2016–17 season.

Club

Technical Staff 

Source: Crvena zvezda Staff

Technical Staff changes

Kit

Supplier: Nike
Main sponsor: mts

Back sponsor: Idea (top); Huawei (bottom)
Left shoulder sponsor: Mitsubishi Motors

Pre-season and friendlies

Crete Heraklion – 2nd International Basketball Tournament

Competitions

Overall

Overview

Adriatic League

Regular season

Results by round

Matches

Playoffs

EuroLeague

Regular season

Results by round

Matches
Source: EuroLeague

Serbian Super League

League table (Group A)

Results by round

Matches

Playoffs

Radivoj Korać Cup

Source: National Cup

Adriatic Supercup

Crvena zvezda had canceled their participation at the Supercup, due to their previously scheduled Euroleague tournament (Crete Heraklion – 2nd International Basketball Tournament), which was held in the same period.

Individual awards

EuroLeague 
MVP of the Round

Adriatic League 
MVP of the Round

MVP of the Month

Ideal Starting Five

Serbian League

Statistics

Adriatic League

EuroLeague

Serbian Super League

Radivoj Korać Cup

Head coaches records 

Updated:

See also 
 List of Nike sponsorships
 2017–18 Red Star Belgrade season
 2017–18 KK Partizan season

References

External links
 KK Crvena zvezda official website 
 Club info at the Adriatic League official site
 Club info at the EuroLeague official site

KK Crvena Zvezda seasons
2017–18 in Serbian basketball by club
Crvena zvezda
Crvena zvezda